"Songs My Mother Taught Me" is a song for voice and piano written in 1880 by Antonín Dvořák. It is the fourth of seven songs from his cycle Gypsy Songs, B. 104, Op. 55. The Gypsy Songs are set to poems by Adolf Heyduk in both Czech and German. This song in particular has achieved widespread fame.

The song has been recorded by a number of well-known singers, including Gabriela Beňačková, Evan Williams, Gervase Elwes, Nellie Melba, Rosa Ponselle, Jeanette MacDonald, Elisabeth Schwarzkopf, Victoria de los Angeles, Joan Sutherland, Paul Robeson, Frederica von Stade, Edita Gruberová, Angela Gheorghiu, Magdalena Kožená, and Renée Fleming. The song is also featured on the album Charlotte Church.

Fritz Kreisler transcribed the song for violin and piano and performed it frequently.  His transcription was first published in 1914. Artists who have recorded instrumental versions of the song include Kreisler himself, Glenn Miller, Julian Lloyd Webber, Yo-Yo Ma, Itzhak Perlman, Joshua Bell, and Tine Thing Helseth.

The title Songs My Mother Taught Me has frequently been used by singers in recitals or on recital discs even when the song itself is not included in the recording.

Lyrics

Discography
 Frederica von Stade (mezzo-soprano) and Rudolf Firkušný (piano), Sony CD (1994) and Kultur DVD (2007)

References

External links 
 

1880 songs
Compositions by Antonín Dvořák
Czech-language songs
Jeanette MacDonald songs